The Lilongwe University of Agriculture and Natural Resources (LUANAR) is a university outside Lilongwe, Malawi. It was formed in 2011 by a merger between Bunda College of Agriculture of the University of Malawi and Natural Resources College (NRC)''.

History 

In a landmark address to the Malawi parliament on 24 May 2010, the third State President of the Republic of Malawi, His Excellency the late Professor Bingu wa Mutharika shared his vision of establishing six universities in Malawi.
This was meant to address the problems of limited University access and to increase the pool of well-trained human resource in the country in order to accelerate the socio-economic development of Malawi. One of the new universities to be established was the Lilongwe University of Agriculture and Natural Resources (LUANAR) which was to be formed by transforming the then Bunda College of Agriculture into a university with the integration of Natural Resources College (NRC).

LUANAR was therefore created through an Act of Parliament No. 22 of 2011 and started her operations on 1 July 2012, with Bunda Campus, as the initial institution until NRC was fully integrated into LUANAR in December 2014.

It has four faculties: Faculty of Agriculture (founded in 1967), Faculty of Natural Resources (2001), Faculty of Development Studies (2004), and Faculty of Food and Human Sciences (2013). Ph.D. programmes are operated in collaboration with the Regional Universities Forum for Capacity Building in Agriculture (RUFORUM).

Bunda Farm, which was part of Bunda College and an economic negative for the college, became a limited company in 2005. In 2017, Bunda Farm Ltd. started a service station with fuel pumps at the campus in order to generate income to the university as well as to train students in business management.

Faculties, departments and centres 
The Lilongwe University of Agriculture and Natural Resources has the following faculties and departments.

Faculty of Agriculture 
The Faculty is organized in six departments namely: Crop and Soil Science Department, Agricultural Engineering Department, Department of Horticulture, Animal Science Department, Basic Sciences Department and Veterinary Medicine (Prospective Faculty of Veterinary Medicine). The Basic Sciences Department is there to provide services to other departments at Bunda College of Agriculture in the teaching of basic and fundamental sciences. These include Biology, Chemistry, Mathematics, Physics, Computer Applications, Microbiology, Biochemistry, and Biometry. Staff members from the department also assist in teaching other courses from sister departments. Some of these courses are pollution science, thermodynamics, gender studies, desktop publishing, management of information systems and other similar courses

Agricultural Engineering Department 
The Agricultural Engineering Department was established at Bunda College of Agriculture in 1972 and has the mandate of teaching, conducting research, and providing outreach and consultancy services in irrigation and agricultural engineering. The department takes a leading role in the promotion of agricultural production through the development and introduction of appropriate engineering technologies and practices for the sustainable production, distribution, and processing of biological products such as crops and livestock. The department places a strong emphasis on research and firmly believes that a research-oriented atmosphere enhances the quality of the teaching and learning process. The department welcomes partnership with industry as one way of linking its teaching and research with industrial needs. The mission of the Agricultural Engineering Department is to advance, promote and disseminate the knowledge and application of engineering needed to efficiently produce, distribute, and process biological products while conserving natural resources, preserving environmental quality, and ensuring the health and safety of people.

Department programs 
Bachelor of Science in Agricultural Engineering
Bachelor of Science in Irrigation Engineering
Master of Science in Irrigation Engineering

Animal Science Department 
The Department of Animal Science is one of the five Departments within the Faculty of Agriculture. The vision of the department is to be a Centre of excellence in Animal Science while its mission is to advance and promote knowledge and skills, self-reliance and sound character in animal science for sustainable livestock production and utilization improving income, food security and nutrition conservation and management of animal biodiversity, the environment and natural resources through Teaching and Training, Research, Outreach and Consultancy in Response to National and International needs.

Department programs 
Bachelor of Science in Animal Science
Diploma in Dairy Science and Technology
Master of Science in Animal Science

Basic Sciences Department 
All first year students at Bunda Campus take foundation courses offered by the Basic Science department. The courses include Biology, Chemistry, Computer Science, Mathematics, Microbiology and Physics.

Crop Sciences Department 
The mission of the Crop science department is to provide high quality tertiary training and generate technologies for the industry and farming sector through teaching, collaborative research and consultancy in crop and soil sciences in order to contribute significantly to food security, poverty alleviation and environmental protection.

Department programs 
Master of Science in Agronomy
Bachelor of Science in Agronomy
Bachelor of Science in Agriculture 
Bachelor of Science in Soil Science
Bachelor of Science in Seed Systems
Master of Science in Plant Breeding
Master of Science in Crop Protection 
Master of Science in Soil Science
Master of Science in Seed Systems
Ph.D in Crop and Soil Science by Research	
Bachelor of Science in Crop Protection (Honors)

The Department of Horticulture 
The Department of Horticulture was initially part of the Department of Horticulture and Forestry until 2014 when it was delinked and moved to the Faculty of Agriculture. The Mission for the Department of Horticulture is to advance knowledge, skills and entrepreneurship in horticulture for sustainable food production, good nutrition and improved income of rural and urban population through teaching, research, extension and consultancies.

Department programs 
Bachelor of Science in Biotechnology
Bachelor of Science in Horticulture
Master of Science in Horticulture

Faculty of Development Studies 
The Faculty of Development Studies was established in 2012 at LUANAR. The faculty has five departments namely; Agriculture Education and Development Communication, Agricultural and Applied Economics, Extension and Rural Development and Agribusiness Management. The following are the Departments under the Faculty of Development Studies.

Agribusiness Management Department 
The Lilongwe University of Agriculture and Natural Resources (LUANAR) through the Department of Agribusiness Management (ABM) is the only higher education institution in Malawi offering long term training in cooperative and microfinance related studies. The Agribusiness Management (ABM) Departments is one of the Departments in the Faculty of Development Studies of Lilongwe University of Agriculture and Natural Resources.

Department programs 
Bachelor of Science in Agribusiness Management 
Bachelor of Science in Agricultural Enterprise Development and Microfinance 
Bachelor Arts in Cooperative Business Studies 
Master of Science in Agribusiness Management

Agriculture Education and Development Communication Department 
This department was established in 1993 to offer Language and Communication Skills courses to undergraduates. Currently, the department offers communication skills courses to all students and trains secondary school agriculture teachers.

Department programs 
Bachelor of Science in Agricultural Development Communication
Bachelor of Science in Agriculture Education
Master of Science in Agriculture Education 	
Bachelor of Science in Agricultural Innovations
Agriculture Education and Development Communication

Agricultural and Applied Economics Department 
The department aims to advance and promote knowledge and practical skills in agricultural and applied economics through training, research, consultancies and outreach with the aim of contributing to poverty reduction by promoting efficiency in agricultural production and increased incomes for the majority of farmers in Malawi. The department envisions of becoming a centre of excellence in training, research, outreach and consultancy in Agricultural and Applied Economics within Malawi and beyond. The department also offers courses in the Collaborative MSc Programme in Agricultural and Applied Economics, a regional programme which aims to equip professionals with knowledge and skills essential for transforming the currently underdeveloped agro-food sectors and rural economies of Eastern, Central and Southern Africa to perform well in an environmentally sustainable fashion.

Department programs 
Bachelor of Science in Agricultural Economics
Bachelor of Science in Development Economics
Master of Science in Agricultural and Applied Economics 
PhD in Agricultural and Resource Economics
PhD in Agricultural and Resource Economics	
Master of Science in Agricultural and Applied Economics	
Bachelor of Arts in Development Economics

Extension Department 
The vision of the department is to become a Centre of excellence in training, research outreach and consultancy in agricultural extension and rural development within Malawi and the region. Its mission is to advance and promote knowledge and practical skills in extension and rural development through teaching, research, outreach and consultancies with the aim of promoting agricultural production, rural incomes and ultimately livelihoods improvement for the majority of small holder farmers in Malawi and the region.

Department programs 
Bachelor of Science in Agricultural Extension
Master of Science in Rural Development and Extension
PhD in Rural Development and Extension

Faculty Of Veterinary Medicine 
The Faculty of veterinary medicine at LUANAR was established in 2013 and began its professional education program in 2014. The Faculty graduated its first batch 12 veterinary doctors in 2019. Veterinary research is conducted in the faculty and has international collaborations with University of Edinburgh, Valencia, Hokkaido, Cornel, and ILRI. The faculty emphasizes research of infectious diseases, Research is also conducted on immunity and nutrition, cardiovascular diseases, reproductive diseases, and diseases of terrestrial and aquatic wildlife. Public Service. The service programs focus on the diagnosis, prevention, treatment, and control and prevention of animal diseases. The faculty assists veterinary practitioners, animal owners, and the general public through partnership with government and NGOs.

Veterinary Pathobiology Department

Department programs 
Bachelor of Veterinary Medicine

Faculty of Food and Human Sciences 
The Faculty of Food and Human Sciences was established following the instituting of Lilongwe University of Agriculture and Natural Resources (LUANAR) through an Act of Parliament No. 22 of 2011. LUANAR emanated from Bunda College of Agriculture, then a constituent college of University of Malawi (UNIMA), which was de-linked from UNIMA on 1 July 2012. The Faculty of Food and Human Sciences (FFHS) stemmed from the then Department of Home Economics and Human Nutrition (DHEHN) which was established in 1984. From 1984 to 2013, the DHEHN grew in terms of staffing (4 to 22), student enrolment (3 to 331), academic programmes (0- 4), teaching and research facilities, financial and material resources, outreach programmes, publications, and in its relevance to national, regional and international development goals. The FFHS became operational in July 2013, consisting of the office of the dean, departments of Food Science and Technology, Human Nutrition and Health, and Human Ecology

Human Nutrition and Health Department 
Just as health citizens are key to national development; adequate nutrition is a key determinant of sound health. The absence of adequate nutrition in all its forms amounts to an intolerable burden that suffocates fulfillment of life goals, enjoyment of life, and the very essence of human survival.

Department programs 
Post-Graduate Diploma in Clinical Dietetics
Master of Science in Human Nutrition
Master of Science in Clinical Dietetic

Human Ecology Department 
Families and resources are very important to the development of a nation. In order to achieve Millennium Development Goals, the effort has to start at family level. Human ecology helps in understanding the relationships between humans, resources and nature, all intimately connected in a web of interactions. The newly established department of Human Ecology at LUANAR has positioned itself to be a key partner in providing academic leadership in human sciences and community services at local and global levels.

Department programs 
Bachelor of Science in Gender and Development
Bachelor of Science in Human Sciences and Community Services
Diploma in Gender and Development
Diploma in Youth Development 	
Master of Science in Gender and Development

Food Science and Technology Department 
Food processing and value addition are key elements in the Malawi Governments strategy to achieve the Millennium Development Goal of eradicating extreme poverty and hunger. The newly established Department of Food Science and Technology at LUANAR has positioned itself to be a key partner in proving academic leadership in food science and technology as well as generating knowledge on the qualities of Malawian raw materials, and how they can be safely processed into high value and good quality food products to meet the demands of Malawian and international markets.

Department programs 
Bachelor of Science in Food Science and Technology
Bachelor of Science in Nutrition and Food Science
Master of Science in Food Science and Technology

Faculty of Natural Resources 
The faculty of Natural Resources established in July 2001, consists of three departments as follows; i.e. Department of Aquaculture and Fisheries Science, Department of Forestry and Department of Environmental Science and Management.

The Department of Forestry 
The Department of Forestry was initially part of the Department of Horticulture and Forestry. The vision of the Department of Forestry is to be LUANAR's center of excellence in training, research, extension and consultancies in forestry within Malawi and globally. It is one of the departments in the Faculty of Natural Resources.

Department programs 
Bachelor of Science in Agroforestry 
Bachelor of Science in Forestry
Master of Science in Agroforestry 	
Master of Science in Environmental Forestry 	
Master of Science in Social Forestry 	
PhD in Forestry

The Department of Aquaculture and Fisheries Science 
Aquaculture and Fisheries Science Department (AQFD) at Bunda College originated from a single course Aquaculture and Wildlife Management offered in the Department of Animal Science from 1974 to 1993. Due to demand for capacity building in Aquaculture from SADC region, a draft Aquaculture curriculum was produced in 1991 and Aquaculture courses were to be offered as an option in the Animal Science Department. The first optional courses were offered in 1994/95-academic year. Students from other countries in SADC started joining the college in the same year for Diploma and Degree programs in Agriculture with bias in aquaculture. Some regional students studying in the Animal Science Masters program had opted to do research in aquaculture.

Department programs 
Bachelor of Science in Aquaculture and Fisheries Science
Master of Science in Aquaculture
Master of Science in Fisheries
PhD in Aquaculture and Fisheries 
Master of Science in Aquaculture and Fishiries

The Department of Environment and Natural Resource Management 
The Department of Environmental Science and Management (DESM) was established in 2001 and it belongs to the Faculty of Natural Resources. The department has a complement of fourteen academic staff positions. The areas of specialization for the staff members include Environmental Management, Wild-life Ecology, Environment and Development, Environmental Science, Environmental and Natural Resource Economics, and Genetic Resource Conservation. There are three positions for technicians in the department to be filled.

Department programs 
Bachelor of Science in Natural Resources Management (Land and Water)
Bachelor of Science in Natural Resources Management (Wildlife and Ecotourism)
Master of Science in Environment and Climate Change

Faculty of Postgraduate Studies 
This offers programmes at the postgraduate diploma, masters and doctoral levels

AquaFish 
AquaFish is one of two Africa Centres of Excellence based in Malawi (the other, ACEPHEM, is based at the University of Malawi College of Medicine).

Centre for Agricultural Research and Development (CARD)

Controversies 
In December 2017, student protests over frequent power outages at the Bunda campus ended in property damages and an arrest of 46 students.  The campus was closed for some time. The Malawi Human Rights Commission that investigated the death of a student found that some students had been subject to torture or inhumane treatment by the police, but did not find the police responsible for the student's death.

References

External links 
 Homepage
 

</noinclude>

Universities in Malawi
Scientific organisations based in Malawi
Buildings and structures in Lilongwe
2011 establishments in Malawi
Educational institutions established in 2011